Paal Nilssen-Love (born 24 December 1974) is a Norwegian drummer and composer in the jazz, free jazz and free improvisation genres.

Early life
Nilssen-Love was born in Molde, Norway. His parents ran a jazz club in Stavanger, and he learned to play drums on the kit owned by his father. As a teenager, he played with free-jazz reedsman Frode Gjerstad, which was the start of a long musical relationship. He did musical studies at Sund folkehøgskole 1993-94. In 1994, during studies on the Jazz program at the Trondheim Musikkonservatorium (1994–96), he formed the band Element which musically became a platform for several other groups with bassist Ingebrigt Håker Flaten and pianist Håvard Wiik and led to collaborations with Iain Ballamy and Chris Potter. Nilssen-Love also did a little composing in the mid-1990s.

Later life and career

Relocating to Oslo in 1996, Nilssen-Love took part in the forming of bands such as Håkon Kornstad Trio, The Quintet and Frode Gjerstad Trio, as well as self-initiated projects. In 1999, Nilssen-Love played his first solo concert.

Continuing, "by the early 2000s, Nilssen-Love had launched an international career, playing alongside Swedish saxophonist Mats Gustafsson and American reed player Ken Vandermark, among others." He has worked with his trio Vandermark and Ab Baars, the bands Large Unit (a big band, with about 14 members, which he has led and composed for since 2013), School Days, The Thing, Scorch Trio, Territory Band, FME, and various duo projects such as with reedmen Peter Brötzmann and Vandermark guitarist Terrie Hessels (The Ex), saxophonist John Butcher, organist Nils Henrik Asheim, and noise experimentalist Lasse Marhaug.

In 2014, Nilssen-Love decided to leave the band Atomic to concentrate on Large Unit and projects involving more improvising.

Awards 
2002: Kongsberg Jazz Award, within Håkon Kornstad Trio
2006: Buddyprisen

Discography

Solo drum recordings
2001: Sticks & Stones (Sofa)
2005: 27 Years Later (Utech)
2010: Miró (PNL)
2012: Chiapaneca (Bocian)
2015: News from the Junk Yard (PNL)

References

External links 

Kornstad Trio - official website of the trio.
Frode Gjerstad Trio
MP3 Interview

1974 births
Free jazz drummers
Living people
Musicians from Molde
Norwegian University of Science and Technology alumni
Norwegian jazz composers
20th-century Norwegian drummers
21st-century Norwegian drummers
Norwegian jazz drummers
Male drummers
Free jazz percussionists
Rune Grammofon artists
Male jazz composers
20th-century Norwegian male musicians
21st-century Norwegian male musicians
Atomic (band) members
The Thing (jazz band) members
Clean Feed Records artists
Smalltown Supersound artists
Utech Records artists
NoBusiness Records artists